The second municipal election in Norfolk County, Ontario, Canada took place November 2003.

While it would fail to dismantle the tobacco status quo of the municipality; the election would weaken it significantly through the influence of the local anti-tobacco youth. Rita Kalmbach (who was pro-tobacco) defeated 21-year-old political neophyte Brian Decker (who was anti-tobacco) by more than half of the popular votes in order to maintain the integrity of the local tobacco farmers and the industry. Around the time of the election, many other municipalities were voluntarily banning smoking in public places. Meanwhile, the town councillor seats remained exactly the same as in 2000. The election occurred with little notice or fanfare.

Three years later, Dennis Travale would become mayor and bring Norfolk County out of its economic stagnancy before the recent Canadian economic meltdown would bring it the local economy back into a state of malaise.

See also
 2010 Norfolk County municipal election
 2006 Norfolk County municipal election
 2000 Norfolk County municipal election

Municipal elections in Norfolk County, Ontario
2003 Ontario municipal elections